Thomas Dixon (6 October 1847 – 23 April 1915) was a South African first-class cricketer. He played for Transvaal in the 1889–90 Currie Cup.

References

External links
 

1847 births
1915 deaths
South African cricketers
Gauteng cricketers